Three Pop Songs is the second EP by the band Ghosty from Lawrence, Kansas, released in 2002.

Track listing 
 "Big Surrender" 	  	  
 "Henry Green"
 "Hey! Somebody"

References 

Ghosty albums
2002 EPs